The Myanmar Football Academy, headed by Myanmar Football President, Zaw Zaw. Myanmar Football Federation has three Academies in Myanmar. There are National Football Academy (Yangon), Myanmar Football Academy (Mandalay) and Ayeyarwady Football Academy (Pathein).

National Football Academy (Yangon)

FIFA president Gianni Infantino officially declared open Myanmar’s National Football Academy on 17 February 2017.

Myanmar Football Academy (Mandalay)

2011 March 15, FIFA President, Sepp Blatter opens Myanmar Football Academy (Mandalay).

Ayeyawady Football Academy (Pathein)

US Dollars Two hundred and fifty thousand was donated by Asian Football Confederation and the remaining US Dollars five hundred thousand was donated by Ayeyawady Foundation for a total cost of US Dollars seven hundred and fifty thousand. Land is donated by Government.

Academy team

Current management

Current Academy squad

Academy graduates

Now playing elsewhere
 Aung Thu, now at  BEC Tero, has played for Myanmar
 Kyaw Min Oo, now at Yangon United, has played for Myanmar
 Sann Satt Naing, now at Yangon United, has played for Myanmar
 Phone Thit Sar Min, now at Shan United, has played for Myanmar U-20
 Aung Wanna Soe, now at Yadanarbon, has played for Myanmar U-20
 Win Naing Tun, now at Yadanarbon, has played for Myanmar U-23
 Pyae Sone Naing, now at Yadanarbon, has played for Myanmar U-23
 Myat Kaung Khant, now at Yadanarbon, has played for Myanmar U-23
 Hein Htet Aung, now at Hanthawaddy United FC, has played for Myanmar U-23

References

External links
Academy page at Yangon.
Mandalay Academy at Mandalay.
Academy page at Pathein.

Academy
National football academies